The Leuven Arrondissement is one of two arrondissements in the Belgian province of Flemish Brabant. It lies east of the Brussels-Capital Region.

Municipalities

The arrondissement is made up of the following municipalities:

Aarschot
Begijnendijk
Bekkevoort
Bertem
Bierbeek
Boortmeerbeek
Boutersem
Diest
Geetbets
Glabbeek

Haacht
Herent
Hoegaarden
Holsbeek
Huldenberg
Keerbergen
Kortenaken
Kortenberg
Landen
Leuven

Linter
Lubbeek
Oud-Heverlee
Rotselaar
Scherpenheuvel-Zichem
Tervuren
Tielt-Winge
Tienen
Tremelo
Zoutleeuw

Formerly independent municipalities or deelgemeenten:

Aarschot
Assent
Attenhoven
Attenrode
Averbode
Baal
Begijnendijk
Bekkevoort
Bertem
Betekom
Bierbeek
Binkom
Blanden
Boortmeerbeek
Bost
Boutersem
Budingen
Bunsbeek
Deurne
Diest
Dormaal
Drieslinter
Duisburg
Eliksem
Erps-Kwerps
Everberg
Ezemaal
Geetbets
Gelrode
Glabbeek-Zuurbemde
Goetsenhoven
Grazen
Haacht

Haasrode
Hakendover
Halle-Booienhoven
Helen-Bos
Herent
Hever
Heverlee
Hoegaarden
Hoeleden
Holsbeek
Houwaart
Huldenberg
Kaggevinne
Kapellen
Keerbergen
Kerkom
Kersbeek-Miskom
Kessel-Lo
Korbeek-Dijle
Korbeek-Lo
Kortenaken
Kortenberg
Kortrijk-Dutsel
Kumtich
Laar
Landen
Langdorp
Leefdaal
Leuven
Linden
Loonbeek
Lovenjoel
Lubbeek

Meensel-Kiezegem
Meerbeek
Meldert
Melkwezer
Messelbroek
Molenbeek-Wersbeek
Molenstede
Neerhespen
Neerijse
Neerlanden
Neerlinter
Neervelp
Neerwinden
Nieuwrode
Oorbeek
Oplinter
Opvelp
Orsmaal-Gussenhoven
Ottenburg
Oud-Heverlee
Outgaarden
Overhespen
Overwinden
Pellenberg
Ransberg
Rillaar
Roosbeek
Rotselaar
Rummen
Rumsdorp
Schaffen
Scherpenheuvel

Sint-Agatha-Rode
Sint-Joris-Weert
Sint-Joris-Winge
Sint-Margriete-Houtem
Sint-Pieters-Rode
Testelt
Tervuren
Tielt
Tienen
Tildonk
Tremelo
Vaalbeek
Veltem-Beisem
Vertrijk
Vissenaken
Vossem
Waanrode
Waasmont
Walsbets
Walshoutem
Wange
Webbekom
Werchter
Wespelaar
Wezemaal
Wezeren
Willebringen
Wilsele
Winksele
Wommersom
Zichem
Zoutleeuw

Leuven